Damir Darvisovich Khamadiyev (born July 30, 1981 in Sverdlovsk, USSR) is a Russian futsal player who plays for Dina Moscow and the Russian national futsal team as a universal. Famous for many games as a part of the Yekaterinburg club "Sinara".

Biography
Khamadiyev was born in Sverdlovsk in a Tatar family. Up to 15 years Damir practised football, then decided to switch to futsal. In 2002, Damir moved to the Ekaterinburg club "Viz-Sinara”. As a part of the Russian national team he won medals of UEFA Futsal Championship. In 2007, Khamadiyev again won the Russian Cup, and a year later he helped "Viz-Sinara" on the way to the first European success - victory in the UEFA Futsal Cup. Afterwards Damir twice won Russian championship as a member of the Yekaterinburg club.

In summer 2011 Khamadiyev moved to the Moscow club Dina Moscow.

Achievements
 UEFA Futsal European Championship silver medalist (1): 2005
 UEFA Futsal European Championship bronze medalist (1): 2007
 FIFA Futsal World Cup semifinalist (1): 2008
 Student FIFA Futsal World Cup Winner  (2): 2002, 2006
 UEFA Futsal Cup Winner (1): 2007-08
 Russian Futsal Championship Winner (3): 2009, 2010, 2014
 Russian Futsal Cup Winner (2): 2001, 2007

External links
MFK Dina Moskva profile
AMFR profile

1981 births
Living people
MFK Dina Moskva players
Russian men's futsal players